Dimitrios Negrepontis (25 March 1915 – June 1996), also Dimitrios Ioannis Negrepontis or Dimitri John Negroponte, was the first-ever Greek to participate in the winter Olympics as an alpine skier, coming from Greek diaspora. He competed in the men's combined event at the 1936 Winter Olympics.

He has four sons: John (a former United States Deputy Secretary of State), George (President of the Drawing Center from 2002 to 2007), Michel (an Emmy Award winning filmmaker) and Nicholas (founder of the Massachusetts Institute of Technology's Media Lab and of the One Laptop per Child project.

References

External links
 

1915 births
1996 deaths
Greek male alpine skiers
Greek male cross-country skiers
Olympic alpine skiers of Greece
Olympic cross-country skiers of Greece
Alpine skiers at the 1936 Winter Olympics
Cross-country skiers at the 1936 Winter Olympics
Sportspeople from Lausanne
Greek expatriates in Switzerland
People from Davos